The Ninh Thuận 2 Nuclear Power Plant is a cancelled nuclear power plant at Vĩnh Hải, Ninh Hải District, Ninh Thuận Province, Vietnam. It was supposed to consist of four 1,000 MWe reactors.

The feasibility study was to be carried out by Japan Atomic Power Company.  Japan Atomic Power Company will also consult the project.  The plant will be built by a consortium, International Nuclear Energy Development of Japan Co, which comprises 13 Japanese companies.  The plant was to be owned and operated by state-owned electricity company EVN. Unit 1 was expected to be commissioned in 2021, unit 2 in 2022, unit 3 in 2024 and unit 4 in 2025. A marine geological survey for preparations of construction was carried out by the Japan-based Kawasaki Geological Survey Company at the ship M.T. Chōyō.

The project was cancelled in November 2016.

See also

 Nuclear energy in Vietnam
 Nuclear energy policy by country - Vietnam
 List of nuclear reactors - Vietnam
 Ninh Thuận 1 Nuclear Power Plant

References

External links
 World-nuclear.org | Nuclear Power in Vietnam
 Vietnam prepares for nuclear power
 Japanese nuclear exports consortium launches

Nuclear power stations in Vietnam
Cancelled nuclear power stations
Buildings and structures in Ninh Thuận province